Nicolas William White (born 13 June 1990) is an Australian rugby union player who plays for Brumbies in Super Rugby. His playing position is scrum-half.

Early life 
White attended St Gregory's College, Campbelltown representing New South Wales Combined Catholic Colleges. He played for NSW  Schools 2nd XV at the Australian Schoolboys Championship in 2007 while in year 11. In 2008 he injured his medial collateral ligament and missed the schoolboy representative season.

Professional career 
Signed by the Brumbies in 2008, he represented Australia at the 2009 World Rugby Under 20 Championship in Japan where Australia made the semi-finals and again represented Australia U20 in the 2010 championship in Argentina where Australia were beaten in the final by New Zealand.

White played in the John I Dent Cup grand final in 2010, kicking a last minute penalty for Queanbeyan to win 30-28 to deny Vikings a fourth grand final victory in a row. In 2011 he joined the Eastwood club in Sydney, playing halfback in their near perfect season, in which they lost only one competition game on the way to defeating Sydney University in the grand final. Nic achieved the rare feat of a hat trick of tries in a finals match in the previous week's final against Randwick, completing his feat in the first 10 minutes of the game.

White made his Brumbies debut during the 2011 Super Rugby season against the Reds in Brisbane. He started 2012 as the starting halfback for the Brumbies as they just failed by a point to make the finals after a poor 2011 season. In 2013 at the age of 23 he was named as the twelfth player to captain the Brumbies when they played the Melbourne Rebels in a Super Rugby game. The Brumbies made the Super Rugby final in 2013 but after an arduous travel schedule, which included beating the Bulls in Pretoria, they faded in the closing stages to lose to the Chiefs in Hamilton. In 2014 they again made the semi-finals, losing to the Waratahs in Sydney and in 2015 lost in the semi-finals to the Hurricanes in Wellington. White was the leading Australian player for try assists in Super Rugby in the 2014 and 2015 seasons.
 On 15 January 2015, White, along with teammate David Pocock, was appointed vice-captain of the Brumbies for the 2015 Super Rugby season.

White made his debut for Australia against Argentina in Perth in 2013 and played a leading role in Australia's narrow victory. He started all three tests in the June series against France in 2014, which the Wallabies won 3-0. Coming off the bench in 2015 against New Zealand in Sydney, White was instrumental in the Wallabies posting their first win over the All Blacks since 2011. He kicked a 50-metre penalty and scored a brilliant individual try, converting for a personal tally of ten points in the 27-19 victory.

In July 2015, White signed a contract to join French Top 14 side Montpellier Hérault.

On 16 March 2017, White signed for English club Exeter Chiefs in England’s Premiership Rugby from the 2017-18 season.

On 9 October 2019, White returned home to Australia to rejoin his Super Rugby side Brumbies.

Statistics

List of international test tries 

As of 20 November 2021

References

External links 
 Nic White at Wallabies
 Nic White at ItsRugby.co.uk
 Nic White at ESPNscrum

1990 births
Living people
Australian rugby union players
Australia international rugby union players
Rugby union scrum-halves
ACT Brumbies players
People from the Hunter Region
New South Wales Country Eagles players
Montpellier Hérault Rugby players
Australian expatriate rugby union players
Australian expatriate sportspeople in England
Australian expatriate sportspeople in France
Expatriate rugby union players in France
Exeter Chiefs players
Rugby union players from New South Wales